Aurat Teri Yehi Kahani is a 1954 Hindi film.

Soundtrack
"Tum Chand Se Haseen Ho" - Talat Mahmood
"Muskurati Hai Ghata Gungunati Hai Hawa" - Asha Bhosle
"Diya Tune Naiya Ko Kaisa Sahara" - Asha Bhosle
"Kisise Kahu Mera Mann Hai Magan" - Rajkumari
"Raat Guzarti Jaaye" - Asha Bhosle
"Sada Hi Sukh Se Dur Rahi Tu" - Bulo C Rani
"Tujhe Apna Sapna Bana Na Saku" - Rajkumari

References

External links
 

1954 films
Films scored by Bulo C. Rani
1950s Hindi-language films
Indian drama films
1954 drama films
Indian black-and-white films
Films directed by Chaturbhuj Doshi